Criniventer rufus is a species of beetle in the family Carabidae, the only species in the genus Criniventer.

References

Harpalinae